This is a list of major shopping centres and retail districts in the city of Saskatoon, Saskatchewan, Canada.

List of enclosed shopping malls in Saskatoon
 The Centre – regional mall
 Confederation Mall
 The Mall at Lawson Heights
 Market Mall
 Midtown Plaza – regional mall

List of public markets
 Saskatoon Farmers' Market

Large non-enclosed shopping centres

Other large non-enclosed shopping centres in Saskatoon include: 
Avalon Shopping Centre strip mall
Blairmore power centre
Canarama Centre strip mall
Circle Centre Mall  and Lifestyle center
College Park Mall strip mall  
Cumberland Square strip mall
Erindale Centre strip mall
Grosvenor Park Centre strip mall
Preston Crossing power centre
River City Centre power centre
Royal Square strip mall  
Stonegate power centre
University Heights Square power centre 
Westgate Plaza strip mall

Other shopping centres and strip malls

There are neighborhood convenience strip malls which are smaller shopping centres located locally in various neighborhoods in Saskatoon.  These are too small to merit their own articles.

Other retail districts
 Central Business District (downtown) – the area enclosed by Idylwyld Drive, 25th Street and the South Saskatchewan River
 Broadway Avenue – from 8th Street E to the Broadway Bridge; the original main street of the first Saskatoon townsite, which later came to be known as Nutana
 Central Avenue – from 108th Street to 115th Street; main street of a town which used to be called Sutherland
 Idylwyld Drive – from 33rd Street to Circle Drive
 8th Street E – from Clarence Avenue to McKercher Drive
 33rd Street W – from Warman Road to Avenue F
 22nd Street W – from Avenue P to Circle Drive (although there is also sporadic commercial development between Avenue P and Idylwyld Drive)
 20th Street W – from Idylwyld Drive to Avenue K; main street of a town which used to be called Riversdale
 51st Street – from Faithfull Avenue to Millar Avenue

Suburban centres
Saskatoon has established several "suburban centres" in neighbourhoods away from the downtown core, most of which include a major commercial component:
 Blairmore Suburban Centre
 Confederation Suburban Centre - includes Confederation Mall, Plaza 22 Strip Mall, Canadian Tire, Superstore, and Royal Square Strip Mall
 Lakewood Suburban Centre
 Lawson Heights Suburban Centre - includes The Mall at Lawson Heights
 Nutana Suburban Centre - includes Market Mall
 University Heights Suburban Centre

See also
 List of shopping malls in Canada

External links
Inside Saskatoon: Shopping
List of malls with store directories in Saskatoon
Drinkle Mall

 
Shopping malls in Saskatoon
Shopping malls in Saskatchewan
Tourist attractions in Saskatoon